Austerson is a civil parish in the unitary authority of Cheshire East and the ceremonial county of Cheshire, England, lying immediately south of the town of Nantwich and north of the village of Audlem. In 2001, the total population was a little under 150, increasing to 194 at the 2011 Census. Nearby villages include Broomhall Green, Hack Green, Hankelow, Sound Heath and Stapeley.

History
Austerson derives from the Saxon Essetune, meaning "Aelfstan's Farm". The civil parish was originally a township in the ancient parish of Acton in the Nantwich Hundred; it was served by St Mary's Church, Acton. Major early landowners include the families of Bulkeley, Wettenhall, Praers and Bromley. In the late 15th century the land was acquired by Sir William Needham of Shavington. Part of Austerson and the adjacent parish of Baddington was forest until at least the mid-17th century, with wood being used as fuel for salt production in nearby Nantwich. A kiln field marked on tithe maps suggests that the parish formerly had a brick kiln. A small council estate was built between 1953 and 1965.

Governance
Austerson is administered by the Sound and District Parish Council. From 1974 the civil parish was served by Crewe and Nantwich Borough Council, which was succeeded on 1 April 2009 by the new unitary authority of Cheshire East. Austerson falls in the parliamentary constituency of Crewe and Nantwich, which has been represented by Kieran Mullan since 2019, and previously by Gwyneth Dunwoody (1983–2008), Edward Timpson (2008–17) and Laura Smith (2017–19).

Geography and transport
The River Weaver forms much of the eastern boundary of the civil parish, and an unnamed brook forms part of the western boundary. The land is generally flat with an average elevation of around 50 metres,  sloping downwards near the eastern boundary to the narrow river valley of the Weaver. There are several small meres and unnamed brooks. A narrow strip of broad-leaved woodland runs along a brook south of Dairy House Farm.

The A530 (Baddington Lane) runs immediately to the west of part of the north-western boundary of the civil parish. Coole Lane runs from the A530 north–south through the northern part of the civil parish. The Crewe and Nantwich Circular Walk also runs broadly north–south through the northern part.

Demography
In 2006, the total population of the civil parish was estimated as 140. The 2001 census recorded a population of 145, in 37 households. The historical population figures were 59 (1801), 55 (1851), 36 (1901), 68 (1951) and 114 (1971).

Landmarks
Austerson Hall is a farmhouse dating from the late 17th century. In brick with a roughcast finish, it follows a T-shaped plan and is grade II listed. Church House Farm is an L-shaped, red-brick former farmhouse dating from around 1820. It has been used as a nursing home since 1989, and is also listed at grade II. The timber-framed Elizabethan building of Austerson Old Hall or Old Hall Farm was moved to Alvanley in 1974. A grade-II-listed barn remains which dates from the late 16th century, and is brick nogged with a timber frame.

Education

There are no educational facilities within the civil parish. The parish falls within the catchment areas of Sound and District Primary School in Sound and Brine Leas High School in Nantwich.

See also

Listed buildings in Austerson

References

Sources
Latham FA, ed. Acton (The Local History Group; 1995)

External links
 
 

Villages in Cheshire
Civil parishes in Cheshire